King Daemusin (4–44, r. 18–44) was the third ruler of Goguryeo, the northernmost of the Three Kingdoms of Korea. He led early Goguryeo through a period of massive territorial expansion, conquering several smaller nations and the powerful kingdom of Dongbuyeo.

Biography 
He was born as Prince Moo-hyul, the third son of King Yuri. At 11 years old he became the crown prince, as the next in line to the throne had committed suicide, and became king upon his father's death four years later.

Daemusin strengthened central rule of Goguryeo and expanded its territory. He annexed Dongbuyeo and killed its king Daeso in 22 AD. In 26 AD he conquered Gaema-guk, along the Amnok River, and later conquered Guda-guk.

After fending off China's attack in 28, he sent his son, Prince Hodong, who was about 16 at the time, to attack the Nangnang Commandery. He also defeated the Nakrang Kingdom in northwestern Korea in 32.  He destroyed Nangnang in 37, but an Eastern Han army sent by Emperor Guangwu of Han, captured it in 44.  He was buried in Daesuchonwon.

In the legend of Prince Hodong and the Princess of Nakrang Daemusin was said to have sent his son into deceiving the princess of Nakrang into destroying the drum that would have warned them for a coming invasion.

Family
Father: King Yuri (유리명왕, 瑠璃明王)
Grandfather: King Dongmyeong (동명성왕, 東明聖王)
Grandmother: Lady Ye (예씨 부인, 禮氏 夫人)
Mother: Queen, of the Song clan (왕후 송씨, 王后 松氏)
Grandfather: Song Yang, Marquis Damul (송양 다물후, 松讓 多勿侯)
Consorts and their respective issue(s):
Unknown lady ("Primary consort" (원비))
Son: Prince Haeu (해우, 解憂; d. 53 AD)
Lady Hae ("Secondary consort" (차비))
Son: Prince Hodong (호동, 好童; d. 32 AD) – married Princess Nakrang (낙랑공주; d. 32 AD).

Modern depiction

Film and television
 Portrayed by Song Il-gook in the 2008 KBS TV series The Kingdom of The Winds.
 Portrayed by Moon Sung-keun in the 2009 SBS TV series Ja Myung Go.

Others
In recent times, Daemusin served as a model for the famous Manhwa and video game Nexus: The Kingdom of the Winds.

Significance of title 
King Muhyul was given the title Daemusin wang, which literally means "Great Holy Warrior King". As with most Goguryeo kings, little is known about Muhyul except for what is stated in some ancient Korean sources. Some historians have inferred that the giving of such an extreme title to this man must mean that he led Goguryeo through many outstanding military accomplishments, possibly more than he is given credit for in historical texts. Another school of thought declares that the destruction of East Buyeo in itself, was an almost unthinkable feat at the time, meaning East Buyeo was a powerful kingdom according to these select scholars.

Not all Goguryeo rulers were given special titles posthumously or in their lifetime. Most Goguryeo rulers were posthumously given titles based on the place of their burial. Only a select few, such as King Gwanggaeto the Great and King Dongmyeongseong, were given such "significant" posthumous names.

See also
The Kingdom of the Winds (TV drama)
Prince Hodong and the Princess of Nakrang
Ja Myung Go (TV drama)

References

Goguryeo rulers
AD 4 births
44 deaths
1st-century monarchs in Asia
1st-century Korean people